Álvaro Arzú Escobar (born 27 February 1985) is a Guatemalan politician from the Unionist Party who served as president of the Congress of Guatemala between 2018 and 2020. He is a son of former President of Guatemala Álvaro Arzú and First Lady Patricia Escobar.

References 

Living people
1985 births
Unionist Party (Guatemala) politicians
Members of the Congress of Guatemala
Presidents of the Congress of Guatemala
Arzú family
Children of national leaders
People from Guatemala City